Alexander of Serbia may refer to:

 Prince Alexander of Serbia (1806–1885), reigned 1842 to 1858
 King Alexander I of Serbia (1876–1903), reigned 1889 to 1903
 King Alexander I of Yugoslavia (1888–1934), reigned 1921 to 1934
 Prince Alexander of Yugoslavia (1924–2016), son of Prince Regent Paul of Yugoslavia
 Alexander, Crown Prince of Yugoslavia (born 1945), current pretender
 Prince Alexander of Yugoslavia (born 1982), son of Crown Prince Alexander of Yugoslavia

See also 
 Alexander of Yugoslavia